RC-19 or Mangalam–Embalam–Maducarai Road starts from Mangalam and ends at Maducarai.

It is passing through the following villages:
 Sembiapalayam
 Embalam
 Nallathur
 Pakkam X Kootroad
 Kalmandapam
 Nettapakkam

References

External links
 Official website of Public Works Department, Puducherry UT

State highways in Puducherry
Transport in Puducherry